Spiliotopoulos is a Greek surname. Notable people with the surname include:

 Aris Spiliotopoulos (born 1966), Greek politician
 Evan Spiliotopoulos, Greek-American screenwriter
 Panagiotis Spiliotopoulos (1891–1962), Greek army officer
 Spilios Spiliotopoulos (born 1941), Greek politician

Greek-language surnames
Surnames